A poverty map is a map which provides a detailed description of the spatial distribution of poverty and inequality within a country. It combines individual and household (micro) survey data and population (macro) census data with the objective of estimating welfare indicators for specific geographic area as small as village or hamlet. 

Recent advances in geographic information systems (GIS), databases and computer aided software engineering make poverty mapping possible, where data can be presented in the form of maps and overlaying interfaces for cross-comparisons.  Spatial analysis and benchmarking are also applied to assess the relationships between the two sets of micro and macro data according to their geographic location.

See also
Life and Labour of the People in London

References

External links
Mapping poverty in America

Measurements and definitions of poverty
Economic geography
Map types